Maksim Varabei (born 10 December 1995) is a Belarusian biathlete. He competed in the 2018 Winter Olympics.

Career results

World Championships

References

1995 births
Living people
Biathletes at the 2018 Winter Olympics
Biathletes at the 2022 Winter Olympics
Belarusian male biathletes
Olympic biathletes of Belarus
People from Barysaw
Universiade silver medalists for Belarus
Universiade medalists in biathlon
Competitors at the 2019 Winter Universiade
Sportspeople from Minsk Region